The 1965–66 Divizia B was the 26th season of the second tier of the Romanian football league system.

The format has been maintained to two series, each of them having 14 teams. At the end of the season the winners of the series promoted to Divizia A and the last two places from each series relegated to Divizia C.

Team changes

To Divizia B
Promoted from Divizia C
 Ceahlăul Piatra Neamț
 Dinamo Victoria București
 CFR Arad
 Arieșul Turda

Relegated from Divizia A
 Minerul Baia Mare
 Progresul București

From Divizia B
Relegated to Divizia C
 Tractorul Brașov
 Sătmăreana Satu Mare
 Chimia Făgăraș
 CFR Timișoara

Promoted to Divizia A
 Siderurgistul Galați
 Știința Timișoara

Renamed teams 
Constructorul Brăila was renamed as Progresul Brăila.

Metalul București was renamed as Metalurgistul București.

Unirea Râmnicu Vâlcea was renamed as Oltul Râmnicu Vâlcea.

Other teams 
Știința Galați gave away its place in the Divizia B to newly founded Oțelul Galați.

League tables

Serie I

Serie II

See also 

 1965–66 Divizia A

References

Liga II seasons
Romania
2